Sardar means army chieftain.

Sardar may also refer to:

Films
 Sardar (1955 film), a film by Gyan Mukherjee
 Sardar (1980 film), Pakistani action film (in Punjabi), featuring the actress Aasia
 Sardar (1993 film), a film by Ketan Mehta

Other uses
 Sardar (IRGC), a form of address for high-ranking officers in Iran's Islamic Revolutionary Guard Corps
 Sardar (Sherpa), a leader of Sherpa guides
 Sardar, Iran (disambiguation)
 Sardar Patel Stadium, a cricket stadium in Ahmedabad, India
 Sardar Sarovar Dam, a large hydroelectric dam on the Narmada River in India
 Füzuli or Sardar, a city in Azerbaijan

People with the given name
 Sardar Azmoun, Iranian footballer
 Sardar Biglari, American businessman 
 Ali Sardar Jafri, Urdu writer
 Sardar Amir Azam Khan, Pakistani politician 
 Sardar Khalid Ibrahim Khan, Kashmiri politician
 Sardar Muhammad Arif Nakai, Pakistani politician
 Sardar Vallabhbhai Patel, Deputy prime minister of India after independence
 Sardar Ajit Singh, Indian revolutionary
 Sardar Buta Singh, Indian politician
 Sardar Swaran Singh, Indian politician
 Sardar Ali Takkar, Pakistani singer
 Sardar Vedaratnam, Indian freedom-fighter

People with the surname
 Hassan Sardar, Pakistani field hockey player
 Hossein Khan Sardar, Iranian governor
 Safar Sardar, Indian footballer
 Ziauddin Sardar, London-based scholar who specializes in the future of Islam, science and cultural relations

See also
 Sardhar, a village in the state of Gujarat, India
 Serdar (disambiguation)
 Sirdar

Arabic masculine given names